This is an incomplete list of people who have served as Lord Lieutenant of Somerset. Since 1714, all Lord Lieutenants have also been Custos Rotulorum of Somerset.

Lord Lieutenants of Somerset
John Russell, 1st Earl of Bedford 1552–1555
William Herbert, 1st Earl of Pembroke 12 May 1559 – 17 March 1570
vacant
Henry Herbert, 2nd Earl of Pembroke 3 July 1585 – 19 January 1601
Edward Seymour, 1st Earl of Hertford 24 April 1601 – 6 April 1621
William Herbert, 3rd Earl of Pembroke 14 April 1621 – 10 April 1630
Philip Herbert, 4th Earl of Pembroke 12 August 1630 – 30 July 1640 jointly with
William Seymour, 1st Marquess of Hertford 26 March 1639 – 1642 jointly with
Philip Herbert, Lord Herbert 30 July 1640 – 1642
William Russell, 1st Duke of Bedford 25 March 1642 – 23 August 1643 (Parliamentarian)
Interregnum
William Seymour, 2nd Duke of Somerset 13 August 1660 – 24 October 1660
James Butler, 1st Duke of Ormonde 22 December 1660 – 22 August 1672
John Seymour, 4th Duke of Somerset 22 August 1672 – 29 April 1675
Heneage Finch, 3rd Earl of Winchilsea 4 June 1675 – 16 July 1683
Charles Seymour, 6th Duke of Somerset 16 July 1683 – 11 August 1687
Henry Waldegrave, 1st Baron Waldegrave 11 August 1687 – 6 November 1688
Ralph Stawell, 1st Baron Stawell 6 November 1688 – 1689
Maurice Berkeley, 3rd Viscount Fitzhardinge 13 April 1689 – 13 June 1690
Thomas Osborne, 1st Marquess of Carmarthen 24 June 1690 – 3 February 1691 jointly with
William Cavendish, 4th Earl of Devonshire 24 June 1690 – 3 February 1691 and
Charles Sackville, 6th Earl of Dorset 24 June 1690 – 3 February 1691
James Butler, 2nd Duke of Ormonde 3 February 1691 – 3 December 1714
Charles Boyle, 4th Earl of Orrery 3 December 1714 – 1 October 1715
George Dodington 1 October 1715 – 28 March 1720
George Dodington, 1st Baron Melcombe 20 June 1720 – 17 February 1744
John Poulett, 2nd Earl Poulett 17 February 1744 – 5 November 1764
Percy Wyndham-O'Brien, 1st Earl of Thomond 27 November 1764 – 16 March 1774
Frederick North, 2nd Earl of Guilford 16 March 1774 – 5 August 1792
John Poulett, 4th Earl Poulett 15 November 1792 – 14 January 1819
Thomas Thynne, 2nd Marquess of Bath 23 February 1819 – 27 March 1837
Henry Fox-Strangways, 3rd Earl of Ilchester 28 April 1837 – 1 June 1839
Edward Portman, 1st Viscount Portman 1 June 1839 – 28 June 1864
Richard Boyle, 9th Earl of Cork 28 June 1864 – 22 June 1904
Thomas Thynne, 5th Marquess of Bath 1904 – 9 June 1946
Sir James Somerville 1946 – 19 March 1949
William Jolliffe, 4th Baron Hylton 10 August 1949 – 14 November 1967
Cecil Townley Mitford-Slade 17 April 1968 – 1978
Sir Walter Luttrell 3 May 1978 – 10 November 1994
Sir John Wills, 4th Baronet 10 November 1994 – 26 August 1998
Elizabeth Gass, Lady Gass 12 February 1999 – 2 March 2015
Anne Maw 2 March 2015 – 29 October 2022
Mohammed Saddiq 29 October 2022 – present

References
 

Somerset
Local government in Somerset
History of Somerset